Matteo Zane (died 1605) was the Patriarch of Venice from 1600 to 1605.

Biography
Prior to his election as Patriarch Zane had served the government of Venice.  He had been ambassador or holder of similar office to Urbino, Portugal, Spain, Austria and the Ottoman Empire.  In the case of the Ottoman Empire he held the office of Bailo in Constantinople, which was considered the key position in the Venetian foreign service.  The bailo acted as both ambassador and consul, not only representing the political interests of Venice but seeking the protection and stability of Venice's merchants in Constantinople.  He also supervised all other consuls of Venice throughout the Ottoman Empire.  While serving as Bailo Zane expanded the number of consuls under his direction from nine to 10.

Zane lacked the degree in either theology or canon law mandated by the Council of Trent.  Negotiations by Venice got this requirement waived and managed to postpone Zane's examination on theology by the Pope and panel of cardinals, as required of all Italian bishops at that time, until 1601.  Zane was able to pass the examination at that time.

Sources
Mary Laven. Virgin's of Venice: Broken Vows and Cloistered Lives in the Renaissance Convent. New York: Penguin Books, 2002.
"Patriarch Matteo Zane" Catholic-Hierarchy.org. David M. Cheney. Retrieved June 28, 2017
Eric Dursteller. "The Bailo in Constantinople: Crisis and Career in Venice's Early Modern Diplomatic Corps" in Mediterranean Historical Review Vol. 16 (2001) p. 1-25.

1605 deaths
Baili of Constantinople
Patriarchs of Venice
Year of birth unknown
Ambassadors of the Republic of Venice to Austria
Ambassadors of the Republic of Venice to Spain
16th-century Venetian people
17th-century Venetian people